
This is a list of songs written about the U.S. state of Alabama or notable locations in the state:
 "Tuscaloosa" (aka Old Quadrangle) by Harry Lipson III
 “King Cotton” by The Secret Sisters
 "Alabam" by Cowboy Copas
 "Alabama" (State Song) written by Julia Tutwiler
 "Alabama" written by Michael Jary-Bruno Balz
 "Alabama Alibi" by Wendel Adkins/Lonesome Dogs
 "Alabama Barbeque" written by (Benny Davis-J. Fred Coots)
 "Alabama Blues" by J. B. Lenoir
 "Alabama Boogie" by Hank Mathews
 "Alabama Boogie Boy" by Tex Atchison
 "Alabama Bound" by Huddie Ledbetter aka Lead Belly
 "Alabama Bound" by Clyde Hurley
 “Alabama Getaway” by Grateful Dead
 "Going To Move To Alabama" by Charley Patton
 "Alabama Jail House" by Rod Morris  
 "Alabama Jubilee" written by Jack Yellen and George L. Cobb
 "Alabama Lady" by Help Yourself (band)
 "Alabama Lullaby" by The Delmore Brothers, written by (Cal de Voll)
 "Alabama Man" by Earl Scott
 "Alabama Moon" written by (George Hamilton Green)
 "Alabama Moonbeam" by John Lithgow
 "Alabama Pines" by Jason Isbell
 "Alabama Rose written by (J. G. Liddicoat)
 "Alabama Saturday Night" by Wilf Carter aka Montana Slim
 "Alabama Saturday Night" by Microwave Dave & the Nukes
 "Alabama Shake" by Gene Summers and the Tom Toms
 "Alabama Shamrock" by The Hackensaw Boys
 "Alabama Shines" by Jerry Fuller
 "Alabama Song" ("Moon of Alabama") by Bertolt Brecht, The Doors
 "Alabama Stomp" Red Nichols
 "Alabama Stronghand Blues" by Bobby Mizzell
 "Alabama The Heart Of Dixie" by Sherry Bryce
 "Alabama Waltz" by Hank Williams
 "Alabama Wild Man" by Jerry Reed
 "All Summer Long" by Kid Rock
 "Alabama Women's Prison Blues" by Wayne Kemp, Mack Vickery
 "Heart Of Dixie" by Darrell McCall
 "Stars Fell On Alabama" by Billie Holiday, Jimmy Buffett written by Frank Perkins/Mitchell Parish
 "Sweet Home Alabama" by Lynyrd Skynyrd
 "Stars Fell on Alabama" by The Mountain Goats
 "Stars In Alabama" by Jamey Johnson
  "Alabama" by Neil Young
  "Alabama" by John Coltrane
  "Alabama Getaway" by The Grateful Dead
  "My Home's In Alabama" by Alabama
  "Flyin' Over Sweet Alabama" by Nikki Hornsby
  "The Three Great Alabama Icons" by Drive By Truckers
 "Alabama" by Paper Rival
 "Alabama" by Rick Hirsch of Wet Willie
 "Tombigbee River"/"Gumtree Canoe" (1847) by S. S. Steele
 "Ala freakin Bama" by (Trace Adkins)
 "Bama Breeze" by (Jimmy Buffett)
 "When the Midnight Choo Choo Leaves for Alabam'" written by Irving Berlin
 “Alabama” by Bishop Gunn
 "Alabama Song" Doors
 "Walking in the Alabama Rain" Jim Croce
 "Shout Bamalama" Wet Willie
 "It's Hard to Be Humble (When You're from Alabama)" Phosphorescent
 "Alabama" by The Louvin Brothers
 "Mississippi Kid" by Lynyrd Skynyrd
 "Bury Me In Dixie" by Riley Green
 "Die For Alabama" by Firekid
 "Where I'm From" by Shelby Lynne
 "End of Time" by The Band Perry

Songs about Birmingham

 "Birmingham Bertha" by McKinney's Cotton Pickers
 "Birmingham" by Randy Newman, Tommy Collins, Tommy Roe, Billy Ward, Chuck Berry, Dickie Goodman,
 "Birmingham Blues" by Charlie Daniels, John Lee Hooker,
 "Birmingham Boogie" by Oran 'Hot Lips' Page, 
 "Birmingham Breakdown" by Duke Ellington
 "Birmingham Bounce" by Hardrock Gunter, Amos Milburn,
 "Birmingham Daddy" by Gene Autry
 "Birmingham Jail" by Huddie Ledbetter aka Lead Belly, Roy Acuff, Michael Martin Murphey, Johnny Bond, Roy Drusky, 
 "Birmingham Lucy" by Bobby Goldsboro
 "Birmingham Mama" by Tony Conn
 "Birmingham Shadows" by Bruce Cockburn
 "Birmingham Tonight" by Delbert McClinton
 "Birmingham's Bounce" by Al Smith
 "Paint Me A Birmingham" by Tracy Lawrence
 "Birmingham" by Drive By Truckers
 "Tuxedo Junction" by Erskine Hawkins
 "Birmingham" by Amanda Marshall
 "Postmarked Birmingham" by Blackhawk (band)
 "Birmingham" by Randy Newman
 "Noctifer Birmingham" by The Mountain Goats
 "Birmingham" by Shovels & Rope
 "Birmingham" by Zach Bryan

Songs about Mobile
 "Guitar Man" by Jerry Reed, Elvis Presley
 "Let It Rock" by Chuck Berry
 "Mobile" by Julius LaRosa, Randy Newman, Marcia Ball
 "Mobile, Alabama" by Curtis Gordon
 "Mobile, Alabama Blues" by Milton Brown
 "Mobile Bay" by Dave Kirby, Curley Putman
 "On Mobile Bay" by Dan Hornsby 1928, April 20, Columbia Records W146165 15276D
 "Mobile Bay Magnolia Blossoms" by Dave Kirby, Curley Putman,
 "Mobile Blues" by Mickey Newbury
 "Mobile Boogie" by The Delmore Brothers
 "Mobile Serenade Polka" by Tim Eriksen
 "Stuck Inside of Mobile with the Memphis Blues Again" by Bob Dylan
 "Mobile" by Mike West
 "Mobile" by The Mountain Goats

Songs about Huntsville
 "Huntsville Forever!" by The Guy Who Sings Songs About Cities & Towns (Matt Farley)
 "Hunstville Lights" by Bobby Brooks a native of Sparta, North Carolina
 "Huntsville Rock 'n Twist" by Rex Hairston
 "Puttin' People On The Moon" by Drive-by Truckers
 "Rocket City Ditty" by MC AC The Rap Lady

Songs about Montgomery
 "Alabama Nova" by The Mountain Goats
"Angel from Montgomery" by John Prine
 "Midnight in Montgomery" by Alan Jackson
 "Montgomery County Breakdown" by Eddie Stubbs
 "Montgomery In The Rain" by Stephen Young
 "Montgomery To Memphis" by Billy Montana
 "Seven Bridges Road" originally written and sung by Steve Young, and then redone by the Eagles, it's about Woodley Road

Songs about Tuscaloosa
 "April 29, 1992" by Sublime
 "Flaggin' the Train to Tuscaloosa" by Mack David and Raymond Scott
 "My Tuscaloosa Heart", by Ken Jenkins
 "Tuscaloosa" by Harry Lipson
 "Tuscaloosa Blues" by Al Harris
 "Tuscaloosa From Alabama" by Cindy Walker
 "Tuscaloosa Lucy" by Whitey Pullen
 "Tuscaloosa Waltz" by Lew Childre, Wade Ray
 "Tuscaloosa Women" by The Stampeders
 "Tuscaloosa Yo Yo Man" by Ritchie Adams
 "Waiting Around to Die" Townes Van Zandt

References

Songs
Alabama

Alabama-related lists